The Uruguay national U-17 football team is the representative of Uruguay within all FIFA sponsored tournaments that pertain to that age level. Uruguay has participated in six of 17 FIFA U-17 World Cup events.

Results and fixtures 
 Legend

2021

2022

U-16 results and fixtures

Players

Current squad
The following 23 players are called up to the squad for the 2023 South American U-17 Championship.

Competitive record

FIFA U-17 World Cup

South American Under-17 Football Championship 

* Draws include knockout matches decided on penalty kicks.

Honours 
FIFA U-17 World Cup
 Runner-up (1): 2011
South American Under-17 Football Championship
 Runner-up (3): 1991, 2005, 2011.

Individual awards 
In addition to team victories, Uruguayans players have won individual awards at FIFA U-17 World Cups.

See also 
 Uruguay national football team
 Uruguay national under-20 football team
 Uruguay national under-23 football team
 South American Under-17 Football Championship

References 

Under-17
South American national under-17 association football teams
Youth sport in Uruguay